The Hero of the Soviet Union was the highest distinction of the Soviet Union. It was awarded 12,775 times. Due to the large size of the list, it has been broken up into multiple pages.

 Akhsarbek Abayev
 Konstantin Abazovsky
 Kadi Abakarov
 Dmitry Abalyev ru
 Abdulikhat Abbasov ru
 Karakoz Abdaliev
 Abdel Hakim Amer
 Alimkai Abdershin ru
 Nurken Abdirov
 Mikhail Abdolov ru
 Asaf Abdrakhmanov
 Shamil Abdrashitov ru
 Ali Abdrezakov ru
 Ramil Abdrshin ru
 Sadyk Abduzhabbarov ru
 Abdurakhman Abdulayev ru
 Mamish Abdullayev
 Samad Abdullayev
 Samig Abdulayev ru
 Urunbai Abdulayev ru
 Anvar Abdullin ru
 Mansur Abdullin ru
 Magomed-Zagid Abdulmanapov ru
 Akhmed Abdulmedzhidov ru
 Ivan Abdulov ru
 Teyfuq Abdul
 Uzeir Abduramanov
 Zulpukar Abdurakhmanov ru
 Sadyk Abelkhanov ru
 Mukatai Abeulov ru
 Rem Abzalov ru
 Fetislyam Abilov
 Fakhrutdin Ablyazov ru
 Aleksey Abolikhin ru
 Afanasy Abramov ru
 Vladimir Nikiforovich Abramov ru
 Vladimir Fyodorovich Abramov ru
 Ilya Abramov ru
 Konstantin Kirikovich Abramov ru
 Konstantin Nikolayevich Abramov ru
 Nikolai Abramov ru
 Pyotr Aleksandrovich Abramov ru
 Pyotr Petrovich Abramov ru
 Tikhon Abramov ru
 Shatiel Abramov
 Abram Abramovich ru
 Sergey Abramtsev ru
 Nikolai Abramchuk ru
 Ivan Abrosimov ru
 Mikhail Abrosimov ru
 Anuar Abutalipov ru
 Konstantin Abukhov ru
 Grigory Abyzov ru
 Gazaros Avakyan ru
 Grant Avakyan ru
 Lavrenty Avaliani 
 Aleksandr Avdeev
 Anatoly Avdeev ru
 Ivan Avdeev ru
 Mikhail Avdeev ru
 Nikolai Avdeev ru
 Timofey Avdeev ru
 Pyotr Adeenko ru
 Semyon Avdoshkin ru
 Ivan Avekov ru
 Ivan Avelichev ru
 Nikolai Averin ru
 Vasily Averchenko ru
 Nikolai Averchenko ru
 Valentin Averyanov ru
 Vasily Averyanov ru
 Ivan Averyanov ru
 Konstantin Averyanov ru
 Stepan Averyanov ru
 Hunan Avetisyan
 Vasily Avramenko ru
 Mikhail Avramenko ru
 Pyotr Avramenko ru
 Prokopy Avramkov ru
 Nikolai Avrorsky ru
 Temik Avtandylyan ru
 Fedos Avkhachyov ru
 Allaberdy Agaliev ru
 Filipp Agaltsev ru
 Goga Agamirov ru
 Sergey Agapov ru
 Aleksey Ivanovich Agafonov ru
 Aleksey Sergeevich Agafonov ru
 Valentin Agafonov ru
 Georgy Agafonov ru
 Semyon Agafonov ru
 Frol Agafonov ru
 Yakov Grigorievich Agafonov ru
 Yakov Mikhailovich Agafonov ru
 Vasily Ageev ru
 Grigory Ageev ru
 Ivan Ageev ru
 Leonid Ageev ru
 Nikolai Ageev ru
 Pytor Ageev ru
 Filipp Ageev ru
 Grigory Ageshin ru
 Mikhail Agibalov ru
 Viktor Agienko ru
 Fayzulla Agletdinov ru
 Hamit Agliullin ru
 Fyodor Aglotkov ru
 Vasily Adamenko ru
 Ivan Adamenko ru
 Noah Adamia
 Sali Adashev ru
 Vasily Adonkin ru
 Dmitry Adonev ru
 Ivan Adushkin ru
 Tulebai Azhimov ru
 Vasily Azhogin ru
 Klychniyaz Azalov ru
 Aleksey Azarov ru
 Vasily Azarov ru
 Yevgeny Azarov ru
 Pyotr Azarov ru
 Semyon Azarov ru
 Sergey Azarov ru
 Mikhail Azev ru
 Domullo Azizoz ru
 Ruzi Azimov ru
 Yuri Azovkin ru
 Aleksandr Azonchik ru
 Mehmet Aipov
 Grigory Ayrapetyan ru
 Armen Ayriev
 Selim Aitkulov
 Izgutty Aytykov ru
 Yusup Akayev ru
 Boris Akazyonok
 Viktor Akatov ru
 Uzarak Akbauov ru
 Azis Akzhigitov ru
 Aleksandr Akimov ru
 Vasily Akimov ru
 Viktor Akimov ru
 Grigory Akimov ru
 Ivan Akimov ru
 Mikhail Ilyich Akimov ru
 Mikhail Pavlovich Akimov ru
 Fyodor Akimov ru
 Yegor Akinyayev ru
 Sergey Akifev ru
 Nikolai Akishin ru
 Fyodor Akkuratov ru
 Ruben Akopyan ru
 Gevork Akopyants ru
 Gazanfar Akbarov
 Nabi Akramov ru
 Aleksandr Afanasevich Aksyonov ru
 Aleksandr Mikhailovich Aksyonov ru
 Vladimir Aksyonov
 Konstantin Vladimirovich Aksyonov ru
 Konstantin Filippovich Aksyonov ru
 Nikolai Aksyutin ru
 Makhmut Aktuganov ru
 Vladimir Akulenko ru
 Fyodor Akulishnin ru
 Pyotr Akulov ru
 Mikhail Akutin ru
 Pyotr Akutsionok ru
 Fyodor Alabugin ru
 Yuri Alasheev ru
 Aleksandr Algazin ru
 Aleksey Aldoshin ru
 Pyotr Aldunenko ru
 Aleksey Aleevsky ru
 Aleksandr Aleynikov ru
 Ivan Aleynikov ru
 Sergey Aleynikov ru
 Mikayil Alakbarov
 Ivan Aleksandrenko ru
 Aleksandr Panayotov Aleksandrov
 Aleksandr Pavlovich Aleksandrov (twice)
 Aleksey Aleksandrov ru
 Andrey Aleksandrov ru
 Vasily Aleksandrov ru
 Vyacheslav Aleksandrov
 Gennady Petrovich Aleksandrov (pilot) ru
 Gennady Petrovich Aleksandrov (tankman) ru
 Mikhail Aleksandrov ru
 Nikita Aleksandrov ru
 Nikolai Aleksandrov ru
 Fyodor Aleksandrov ru
 Vasily Aleksandrovsky ru
 Viktor Aleksandryuk ru
 Nikolai Aleksashkin ru
 Aleksandr Alekseevich Alekseev ru
 Aleksandr Ivanovich Alekseev ru
 Anatoly Dmitrievich Alekseev ru
 Anatoly Ivanovich Alekseev ru
 Andrey Alekseev ru
 Boris Andreev Alekseev ru
 Boris Pavlovich Alekseev ru
 Vasily Alekseev ru
 Vladimir Alekseev
 Georgy Alekseev ru
 Grigory Alekseevich Alekseev ru
 Grigory Fedotovich Alekseev ru
 Yevsey Alekseev ru
 Ivan Epifanovich Alekseev ru
 Ivan Mikhailovich Alekseev ru
 Ivan Pavlovich Alekseev ru
 Konstantin Alekseev ru
 Maksim Alekseev ru
 Modest Alekseev ru
 Nikolai Alekseevich Alekseev ru
 Nikolai Vasilyevich Alekseev ru
 Nikolai Mikhailovich Alekseev ru
 Pavel Alekseev ru
 Sergey Alekseev ru
 Yakov Alekseev ru
 Aleksandr Alekseenko ru
 Georgy Alekseenko ru
 Konstantin Alekseenko ru
 Timofey Alekseychuk ru
 Vladimir Aleksenko (twice)
 Yuozas Aleksonis ru
 Vasily Aleksukhin ru
 Aleksey Alelyukhin (twice)
 Anton Alekhnovich ru
 Yevgeny Alekhnovich ru
 Andrey Alyoshin
 Nikolai Alyoshin ru
 Semyon Alyoshin ru
 Stepan Aleshkevich ru
 Aleksandr Alyoshkin ru
 Aleksandr Aliyev ru
 Gasret Aliyev
 Mastan Aliyev
 Said Aliyev ru
 Shamsulla Aliyev
 Abylai Alimbetov ru
 Ivan Alimenkov ru
 Ivan Alimkin ru
 Zarif Alimov ru
 Vasily Alin ru
 Sadyk Alinazarov ru
 Vladimir Aliseyko ru
 Vasily Alisov ru
 Sultan Alisultanov ru
 Nikolai Alifanov ru
 Vladimir Alkidov ru
 Museyib Allahverdiyev
 Avgust Allik ru
 Galaktion Alpaidze
 Nikolai Alpatov ru
 Semyon Alpeev ru
 Aleksandr Altunin
 Ivan Sergeevich Altukhov ru
 Ivan Filippovich Altukhov ru
 Nikolai Altynov ru
 Vsevold Alfyorov ru
 Ivan Alfyorov ru
 Nikolai Alferev ru
 Dmitry Alfimov ru
 Vladimir Alkhimov ru
 Vasily Altsybeev ru
 Aleksey Alymov ru
 Marcel Albert
 Veniamin Albetkov ru
 Ivan Alyayev ru
 Ivan Alyapkin ru
 Ashot Amatuni
 Ivan Amvrosov ru
 Aleksey Amelin ru
 Georgy Amelin ru
 Sergey Amelichkin ru
 Amet Sultan Amet-khan (twice)
 Konstantin Amzin ru
 Viktor Amiev ru
 Minnetdin Aminov ru
 Hallaq Aminov ru
 Safar Amirshoev
 Aleksandr Amosenkov ru
 Aleksandr Amosov ru
 Georgy Amyaga ru
 Daniil Anachenko ru
 Ivan Ananev ru
 Martyn Ananev ru
 Nikolai Ananev ru
 Pyotr Ananev ru
 Stepan Ananin ru
 Mikhail Anashkin
 Igor Andzaurov ru
 Jacques André
 Aleksandr Andreev ru
 Aleksey Dmitrievich Andreev ru
 Aleksey Sergeevich Andreev ru
 Anatoly Andreev ru
 Andrey Ivanovich Andreev ru
 Andrey Matveevich Andreev
 Vasily Alekseevich Andreev ru
 Vasily Apollonovich Andreev ru
 Viktor Andreev ru
 Vladimir Andreev ru
 Georgy Andreev ru
 German Andreev ru
 Grigory Andreev ru
 Yevgeny Andreev
 Ivan Yefimovich Andreev ru
 Ivan Fyodorovich Andreev ru
 Kesar Andreev ru
 Kirill Andreev ru
 Mikhail Andreev ru
 Nikolai Mikhailovich Andreev ru
 Nikolai Pavlovich Andreev ru
 Nikolai Rodionovich Andreev ru
 Nikolai Trofimovich Andreev ru
 Nikolai Fyodorovich Andreev ru
 Pyotr Andreev ru
 Semyon Andreev ru
 Filipp Andreev ru
 Yevgeny Andreenko ru
 Nikolai Andreenkov ru
 Ilya Andreyko ru
 Nikolai Andreyko ru
 Vasily Andreychenko ru
 Aleksey Andreshov ru
 Vasily Andreyanov ru
 Andrey Andrianov ru
 Vasily Andrianov (twice)
 Ilya Andrianov ru
 Vasily Andrienko ru
 Aleksandr Andriyanov ru
 Vasily Andronov ru
 Nikolai Androsov ru
 Ivan Androshchuk ru
 Valentin Andrusenko ru
 Kornei Andrusenko
 Husen Andrukhayev ru
 Ilya Andryukhin ru
 Yakov Andryushin ru
 Nikolai Andryushok ru
 Vladimir Andryushchenko ru
 Grigory Andryushchenko ru
 Sergey Andryushchenko ru
 Yakov Andryushchenko ru
 Nikolai Aleksandrovich Anikin ru
 Nikolai Andreevich Anikin ru
 Vladimir Anisenkov ru
 Aleksey Anisimov ru
 Vasily Anisimov ru
 Viktor Vasilyevich Anisimov ru
 Viktor Dmitrievich Anisimov ru
 Yevstafy Anisimov ru
 Pyotr Anisimov ru
 Yakov Anisimov ru
 Fyodor Anisichkin ru
 Aleksandr Aniskin ru
 Mikhail Aniskin ru
 Vladimir Anisov ru
 Stepan Anisov ru
 Aleksandr Anishchenko ru
 Sergey Anishchenko ru
 Pavel Anishchekov ru
 Yegor Ankudinov ru
 Ivan Ankudinov ru
 Oras Annayev ru
 Mikhail Anoprienko ru
 Nikolai Anosov ru
 Aleksey Anokhin ru
 Dmitry Anokhin ru
 Ivan Anokhin ru
 Konstantin Anokhin ru
 Sergey Grigorievich Anokhin ru
 Sergey Nikolaevich Anokhin
 Mikhail Anoshin ru
 Fyodor Anoshchenkov ru
 Anatoly Anpilov ru
 Nikolai Ansimov ru
 Fyodor Antashkevich ru
 Avak Antinyan ru
 Iosif Antipenko ru
 Ivan Alekseevich Antipin ru
 Ivan Nikolayevich Antipin ru
 Mihkail Antipin ru
 Filipp Antipin ru
 Mikhail Antipov ru
 Pyotr Antipov ru
 Yuri Antipov ru
 Aleksey Antonenko ru
 Kuzma Antonenko ru
 Nikita Antonets ru
 Aleksandr Antonov ru
 Anatoly Antonov ru
 Anton Antonov ru
 Vasily Dmitrievich Antonov ru
 Vasily Petrovich Antonov ru
 Vladimir Aleksandrovich Antonov ru
 Vladimir Semyonovich Antonov ru
 Grigory Antonov ru
 Ivan Vasilyevich Antonov ru
 Ivan Nikolayevich Antonov ru
 Ivan Petrovich Antonov ru
 Ilya Antonov ru
 Konstantin Antonov ru
 Mikhail Antonov ru
 Neon Antonov
 Nikolai Grigorievich Antonov ru
 Nikolai Dmitrievich Antonov (1909—1986) ru
 Nikolai Dmitrievich Antonov (1922—2000) ru
 Nikolai Ivanovich Antonov ru
 Semyon Antonov ru
 Fyodor Antonov ru
 Yakov Andreevich Antonov ru
 Yakov Ivanovich Antonov ru
 Stepan Antonyuk ru
 Yakov Antoshin ru
 Ivan Antoshkin ru
 Nikolai Pavlovich Antoshkin ru
 Nikolai Timofeevich Antoshkin 
 Vasily Antropov ru
 Mikhail Antyasov ru
 Mitrofan Anufriev ru
 Pyotr Anuchkin ru
 Nikolai Anfinogenov ru
 Pavel Antseborenko
 Aleksandr Antsupov ru
 Aleksandr Anchugov ru
 Maksim Aparin ru
 Stanislovas Apivala ru
 Ivan Apletov ru
 Sergey Apraksin ru
 Suren Arakelyan ru
 Aleksey Arapov
 Gafiatulla Araslanov ru
 Nikolai Argunov ru
 Valentin Ardashev ru
 Leonid Ardashev ru
 Yakov Ardintsev ru
 Pavel Ardyshev ru
 Ivan Arendarenko ru
 Konstantin Arefev ru
 Pyotr Arefev ru
 Nikolai Arzhanov ru
 Gurgen Arzumanov ru
 Dmitry Aristarkhov ru
 Yegor Aristov ru
 Grigory Arlashkin ru
 Pol Arman ru
 Grigory Armashev ru
 Raisa Aronova
 Valery Arsyonov ru
 Ivan Arsenev ru
 Nikolai Arsenev ru
 Aleksandr Arsenyuk ru
 Aleksey Artamonov ru
 Vasily Artamonov ru
 Viktor Artamonov ru
 Vladimir Artamonov ru
 Ivan Ilyich Artamonov ru
 Ivan Artamonov ru
 Nikolai Artamonov
 Stepan Artamonov ru
 Fyodor Artamonov ru
 Aleksandr Artyomenko ru
 Anatoly Artyomenko ru
 Stepan Artyomenko (twice)
 Yuri Artyomenko ru
 Pavel Artyomov ru
 Pyotr Artyomov ru
 Aleksandr Artyomtsev ru
 Grigory Artemchenkov ru
 Aleksandr Artemev ru
 Ivan Artemev ru
 Nikolai Artemev ru
 Timofey Artemev ru
 Fyodor Andreevich Artemev ru
 Fyodor Polikarpovich Artemev ru
 Ilya Artishchev ru
 Georgy Artozeev ru
 Aleksandr Artyuk ru
 Vladimir Artyuk ru
 Yuri Artyukhin
 Georgy Arustamov ru
 Mikhail Arutyunov ru
 Aydin Arutyunyan ru
 Nikolai Arkhangelsky ru
 Pavel Arkharov ru
 Fyodor Arkhipenko
 Vasily Sergeevich Arkhipov (twice)
 Vasily Stepanovich Arkhipov ru
 Nikolai Arkhipov ru
 Yuri Arkhipov ru
 Anatoly Artsebarsky
 Nikolai Archakov ru
 Boris Arshintsev ru
 Vasily Aryaev ru
 Garay Asadov
 Boris Asadchikh ru
 Jumash Asanaliev ru
 Dair Asanov
 Aleksey Aseev ru
 Grigory Aseev ru
 Igor Aseev ru
 Fyodor Aseev ru
 Ivan Asessorov ru
 Vasily Askalepov
 Aleksey Askarov ru
 Gayfutdin Askin ru
 Suren Aslamazashvili ru
 Hazi Aslanov (twice)
 Aleksandr Asmanov ru
 Ivan Asmolov ru
 Ashot Asriyan ru
 Vasily Astafyev ru
 Ivan Astafev ru
 Ivan Ivanovich Astakhov ru
 Ivan Mikhailovich Astakhov ru
 Yegor Astashin ru
 Mikhail Astashkin ru
 Sergey Astrakhantsev ru
 Zakir Asfandiyarov ru
 Sergey Asyamov ru
 Annaklych Atayev 
 Mukhammed Atayev ru
 Adam Ataman ru
 Pyotr Atamanovsky ru
 Grigory Atamanchuk ru
 Semyon Atrokhov ru
 Oleg Atkov
 Toktar Aubakirov
 Vasily Aulov ru
 Koigeldy Aukhadiev ru
 Ruslan Aushev
 Ivan Afanasenko
 Aleksandr Nikiforovich Afanasyev ru
 Aleksandr Petrovich Afanasyev ru
 Aleksandr Fadeevich Afanasyev ru
 Aleksey Afanasevich Afanasyev ru
 Aleksey Ivanovich Afanasyev ru
 Aleksey Nikolayevich Afanasyev ru
 Anatoly Afanasyev ru
 Boris Afanasyev ru
 Vasily Nikolaevich Afanasyev ru
 Vasily Safronovich Afanasyev ru
 Viktor Mikhailovich Afanasyev (cosmonaut)
 Viktor Mikhailovich Afanasyev (soldier) ru
 Vladimir Afanasyev ru
 Ivan Afanasyev ru
 Kuzma Afanasyev ru
 Mikhail Andreevich Afanasyev ru
 Mikhail Denisovich Afanasyev ru
 Nikifor Afanasyev ru
 Nikolai Ivanovich Afanasyev ru
 Nikolai Fyodorovich Afanasyev ru
 Pavel Afanasyev ru
 Semyon Afanasyev ru
 Sergey Afanasyev ru
 Fyodor Afanasyev ru
 Yakov Afanasyev ru
 Ivan Afonin ru
 Aleksey Afrikanov ru
 Filipp Akhayev ru
 Mutyk Akhmadullin ru
 Fazulyan Akhmaletdinov ru
 Andrey Akhmametev ru
 Alexey Akhmanov 
 Jamil Ahmadov
 Mikhail Akhmedov ru
 Turgun Akhmedov ru
 Tukhtasin Akhmedov ru
 Fatulla Akhmedov ru
 Gabit Akhmedov ru
 Hakimyan Akhmetgalin ru
 Zaynetdin Akhmetzyanov ru
 Abdulla Akhmetov ru
 Kayum Akhmetshin ru
 Yagafar Akhmetshin ru
 Kasim Akhmirov ru
 Nikifor Akhremenko ru
 Sergey Akhromeev
 Enver Akhsarov ru
 Mikhail Akhtyrchenko ru
 Sobir Akhtyamov ru
 Hasan Akhtyamov ru
 Anatoly Achkasov ru
 Sergey Achkasov ru
 Yakov Achkasov ru
 Aydamir Achmizov ru
 Mikhail Ashik ru
 Akhmetrashit Ashirbekov ru
 Seitkasim Ashirov ru
 Fyodor Ashmarov ru
 Nikita Ashurkov ru
 Eduard Ayanyan ru

References 

Lists of Heroes of the Soviet Union